Rabba is a town in Jordan in the Karak Governorate. As ancient Areopolis, it is a former bishopric and present Latin Catholic titular see.

Rabba lies about 15 kilometers north of the city of Al-Karak. It had a population of about 7200 in 2015.

Geography
Rabba lies on the historical King's Highway. It is situated on a thin semi-fertile plain, giving way to Wadi Ibn Hammad in the west, and the desert in the east. Located near the northern edge of the town is the Farming College, a branch of Mu'tah University.

History

Iron Age to Byzantine period
Rabba was formerly known as Rabbath Moab. In the Hellenistic and Roman times it was called Areopolis, its Greek name. It was one of the two leading cities of the Karak Plateau at this time.

Areopolis is mentioned by Ptolemy, Eusebius, who cited the terrifying nature of the place, Hierocles and Stephen of Byzantium, Sozomen and also the Notitia Dignitatum The town is shown on the Tabula Peutingeriana and the Madaba map and is attested to on numerous milestones. Areopolis also minted its own coin between 193 and 222 CE.

In the Byzantine period, Rabba was the site of a Jewish community numbered at 15,000 people, centered around a spectacular synagogue, then said to be comparable to Solomon's Temple. During the 5th century CE, Rabba was visited by a Mesopotamian monk named Barsauma, who during his pilgrimage to the region clashed with locals and forced them to convert to Christianity. According to ancient sources, after its doors miraculously opened, the synagogue was set on fire. Looting was forbidden by Barsauma's order, and the synagogue burned to the ground. It is unclear if local Jews had converted to Christianity.

Mamluk period
In 1321 Abu'l-Fida noted: "Maab, or Ar Rabba lies in the Balka Province. According to the 10th-century Arab geographer al-Muhallabi, this place and Adhruh are two towns in the Jabal Ash Sharah.} Maab was a very ancient town the relics of which have completely disappeared, and in its place is a village called Ar Rabbah. It is in the district of Al Karak, and lies about half a day's march from this to the north. Near Ar Rabbah is an extremely high hill, called Shaihan, which you see from afar."

Ottoman period
In 1596 it appeared in the Ottoman tax registers named as Kafr Rabba, situated in the nahiya (subdistrict) of Karak, part of the Sanjak of Ajlun. It had 16 Muslim and 3 Christian households. They paid a fixed tax-rate of 25% on agricultural products, including wheat, barley, summer crops, vineyards/fruit trees, goats and bee-hives; in addition to occasional revenues. The total tax was 12,000 akçe.

Jordan
In 1961 there were 1,073 inhabitants in Rabba, of whom 200 were Christian.

Archaeological remains
Rabba is home to Nabatean, Roman and Byzantine ruins, which are located along the main street in the center of town. They consist of the remains of a Roman temple dedicated to the emperors Diocletian and Maximian, a Byzantine church and a cavernous ancient reservoir. There are many smaller ruins scattered all over town albeit not as extensive.

Population
Rabba was traditionally populated largely by the Majali and Zureikat families, the first of which has considerable political influence in the country.  However, since the establishment of Israel in 1948, many Palestinians, who left their homes in Palestine, settled in Rabba as well, now accounting for about a third of the town's population.

Economy
The economy in Rabba is largely agrarian, and relies greatly on seasonal crops such as wheat and oats. Many people own sheep goats or cattle.

Ecclesiastic history

Ancient bishopric
Areopolis was important enough in the Late Roman province of Palestina Tertia to become a suffragan of its capital Petra's Metropolitan Archbishopric, but was to fade.

Known bishops include:
Anasasius of Areopolis, Council of Chalcedon.
Rufinus of Areopolis at the Council of Ephesus
Bishop of Areopolis who attended Synod of Jerusalem 518.
John, Bishop of Areopolis, known only from an inscription of about 590AD

Titular see
In the 18th century, the diocese was nominally restored as a Latin Catholic titular bishopric Areopolis (Areopoli in Curiate Italian) and had the following incumbents of the fitting episcopal (lowest) rank. Bishops include:
 Pietro d’Alcántara della Santissima Trinità Gagna di Cherasco, Discalced Carmelites (O.C.D.) (1728.01.28 – 1744.11.03)
 João da Madre de Deus Seixas da Fonseca Borges, Benedictines (O.S.B.) (1733.09.28 – 1768.03.05)
 Florence of Jesus of Nazareth Szostak, O.C.D. (1746.01.19 – 1773.07.26)
 :pl:Tomasz Ignacy Zienkowicz(1755.07.21 – 1790.12.09)
 William Wareing (1840.06.05 – 1850.09.29)
 :de:Anton Frenzel (1852.09.27 – 1873.04.03)
 Blessed Ciriaco María Sancha y Hervás (1876.01.28 – 1882.03.27) (later Cardinal*)
 Francesco Giordani (1882.07.03 – 1887.11.25)
 Gabriele Gzele (1888.06.01 – 1903)

In 1903 it was promoted as Titular archbishopric, and as such had the following incumbents of the fitting archiepiscopal (intermediary) rank :
 Titular Archbishop Henry Moeller (1903.04.27 – 1904.10.31)
 Titular Archbishop Lazare Miedia (1904.12.24 – 1909.04.14)
 Titular Archbishop :it:Paolo Emilio Bergamaschi (1910.07.26 – 1925.02.10)
 Titular Archbishop Saint Angelo Giuseppe Roncalli (1925.03.03 – 1934.11.30) (later Pope John XXIII*)

In March 1925 it was demoted back to titular bishopric. It is vacant since decades, having had the following incumbents of fitting episcopal rank :
 Michael Joseph Keyes, Marists (S.M.) (1935.09.23 – 1959.08.07)
 Leonardo Gregorio Gallardo Heredia (1960.02.13 – 1961.05.23)
 René-Noël-Joseph Kérautret (1961.07.22 – 1965.05.09)

References

Bibliography

Sources and external links
 GCatholic with titular incumbent bio links
 Manar al-Athar Digital Archive - Rabba temple

Populated places in Karak Governorate
Jews and Judaism in Jordan